Lori Morning is a fictional character in DC Comics' Legion of Super-Heroes.

Early appearances
She first appeared as part of the Underworld Unleashed crossover, as the ten-year-old daughter of one of Chronos' henchmen; her father Ron first appeared in a 1989 issue of The Atom, also written by Tom Peyer. Chronos had gained increased time travel powers from Neron, but with a side effect of prematurely aging. He found a way to transfer that side-effect onto someone else, and realized a child would be able to store more chronal energy before dying of old age than an adult. After his defeat by the Legion, Lori remained in the 30th century.

Stuck at a physical age of seventeen (but still mentally 10), and with no way to return to the 20th century, she was "adopted" by the Legion. She instantly developed a crush on time-travel researcher Rond Vidar.

She briefly defended the Legion Headquarters against shapeshifting "Proteans" as "Future Girl", subsequently befriending one whom she named Proty.

Life with the Legion of Super-Heroes
Eventually, much to her disappointment, Vidar found a way of removing the excess chronal energy, and she returned to her former age. Shortly after that she gained access to the Hero dial, and began secretly taking various superhero identities to aid the Legion. The dial had actually been given to her by the Time Trapper, but when the Trapper attempted to recruit her, she used the power of the dial to defeat him as "Galaxy Girl".  

Shortly after this, when an attempt by Leland McCauley to utilise the power of a mysterious space anomaly resulted in time stopping, Lori found herself as one of the few beings unaffected. She attempted to use the H-dial to help, but was stopped by the Time Trapper, who felt she was too unpredictable. Although she did not see her assailant, the Trapper's face was visible, and was her own.

The Legion eventually learned that Lori had been using the H-dial. Their disagreement as to whether she was ready to be a hero led to her leaving, and joining McCauley's Workforce. It was discovered the Legion had not claimed to be her legal guardian, and so McCauley's Khundian assistant Amilia Crugg did so.

Following the Blight, McCauley announced that risking the lives of teens was unconscionable, and that the Workforce would now consist of adults. This was an anti-Legion PR move that backfired when it was revealed, as the new Workforce battled the Rift, that one member was Lori, using the dial. Lori gave the dial to Brainiac 5.1 so he could use it to stop the Rift, and it was destroyed. This marked the character's final appearance in the Legion titles to date; that version of the Legion's continuity was later rebooted.

Due to her name, and that she was a blonde girl of fluctuating age who was possibly destined to be the Time Trapper, it has been speculated that Lori was the post-Reboot version of Glorith, a theory which was confirmed by the Legion creative team during a panel discussion at the 1999 Heroes Convention in Charlotte, North Carolina.

See also
List of Legion of Super-Heroes members

External links
Lori Morning biography

Comics characters introduced in 1995
DC Comics female superheroes